Rippon may refer to:

Locations
 Rippon, West Virginia, United States, an unincorporated community
 Rippon station, a railway station in Woodbridge, Virginia, United States
 Rippon Glacier, a glacier in Kemp Land, East Antarctica
 Rippon Tor, a granite tor in Dartmoor, England

Other uses
 Rippon (surname)
 , various Royal Navy ships
 Rippon College, a girls' school in Galle, Sri Lanka
 Rippon Lodge, oldest house in Prince William County, Virginia, United States

See also
Ripon